Venon may refer to the following communes in France:
 Venon, Eure, in the Eure department
 Venon, Isère, in the Isère department
 Uzay-le-Venon, in the Cher department